Zulfiqar Ahmed (born 22 November 1926 – 3 October 2008) was a former Pakistani cricketer who played in 9 Tests from 1952 to 1956. He was educated at Islamia College, Lahore.

He was primarily an off-spin bowler, but was also a very useful late-order batsman. His finest hour was when he took 11 for 79 in the match in a Test against New Zealand in Karachi in 1955.

His sister, Shahzadi, married Pakistani cricket captain Abdul Hafeez Kardar and he became his brother-in-law.

References

External links
 

1926 births
2008 deaths
Pakistani cricketers
Pakistan Test cricketers
Punjab University cricketers
Bahawalpur cricketers
Pakistan International Airlines cricketers
North Zone cricketers
North Zone (Pakistan) cricketers
Punjab (Pakistan) cricketers
Government Islamia College alumni